Glenn Close is an American actress with an extensive career in film, television, and stage. She began her professional career on stage in 1974 with Love for Love and was mostly a New York stage actress until the early 1980s. Her work included Broadway productions of Barnum in 1980 and The Real Thing in 1983, for which she won the Tony Award for Best Actress in a Play. Her film debut came in The World According to Garp (1982), which was followed by supporting roles in the films The Big Chill (1983) and The Natural (1984); all three earned her nominations for the Academy Award for Best Supporting Actress. Close went on to establish herself as a Hollywood leading lady with roles in Fatal Attraction (1987) and Dangerous Liaisons (1988), both of which earned her nominations for the Academy Award for Best Actress.

Close won two more Tony Awards for Death and the Maiden in 1992 and Sunset Boulevard in 1995. She won her first Primetime Emmy Award for the 1995 television drama film Serving in Silence: The Margarethe Cammermeyer Story, and she continued a successful film career with starring roles in Reversal of Fortune (1990) and Air Force One (1997), among others, while being also well known for her portrayal as the villainous Cruella de Vil in 101 Dalmatians (1996) and the sequel 102 Dalmatians (2000). Further television work came for Close in the 2000s, with her portrayal of Eleanor of Aquitaine in the 2003 television film The Lion in Winter earning her a Golden Globe Award. From 2007 to 2012, Close starred as Patty Hewes in the drama series Damages, which won her a Golden Globe Award and two Primetime Emmy Awards. She returned to the Broadway stage in a 2014 revival of A Delicate Balance. During this period, she received two additional Best Actress Academy Award nominations for Albert Nobbs (2011) and The Wife (2017), winning a third Golden Globe for the latter. In 2020, she starred in Hillbilly Elegy and received her fourth Academy Award nomination for Best Supporting Actress, her eight nomination overall, making her one of the five most-nominated actresses in Academy history.

Film

Television

Documentaries

Theatre

Video game

Theme park attractions

References

Close, Glenn
Close, Glenn